Edward Otha South (November 27, 1904 – April 25, 1962) was an American jazz violinist.

Biography
South studied classical music in Budapest, Paris, and Chicago.  He turned to jazz because, as a Black musician, there was no room for him in classical music. In the 1920s he was a member of jazz orchestras led by Charlie Elgar, Erskine Tate, and Jimmy Wade. From 1928 to 1930, he was touring in Europe with his band, Eddie South's Alabamians, with whom he had already made several records.  He recorded during this tour as well. During this tour, the Alabamians had an extended stay in Venice, in 1928, at the Luna Hotel.

He led a band in the early 1930s that included Milt Hinton and Everett Barksdale. In 1937 he recorded in Paris with Stephane Grappelli, Django Reinhardt, and Michel Warlop. In 1945 he worked for the studio band at WMGM in New York City. During the 1950s, he was a guest on television with Fran Allison and Dave Garroway and on WGN in Chicago.

On September 2, 2020, The New York Times consulted violinist Mazz Swift, who selected Eddie South's performance of "Black Gypsy" for a feature on "5 Minutes That Will Make You Love the Violin."

References

Bibliography

External links
 Jazz Hot Big Step
 Eddie South and His Alabamians at Red Hot Jazz

1904 births
1962 deaths
American jazz violinists
American male violinists
Swing violinists
Vaudeville performers
Chess Records artists
20th-century American violinists
People from Louisiana, Missouri
Jazz musicians from Missouri
20th-century American male musicians
American male jazz musicians
American expatriates in Hungary
American expatriates in France